Charles William Murphy (14 February 1870 – 18 June 1913) was a prolific British composer of music hall and musical theatre tunes.

Biography

He was born William Murphy in Manchester, England.  He started writing songs in the 1890s, including "Dancing to the Organ in the Mile End Road" (1893).  Another song, "Little Yellow-bird" (1903) (aka "Goodbye, Little Yellow Bird") written with lyricist William Hargreave, was first performed by Ellaline Terriss. It can be seen performed by Scottish comedian Charlie Naughton in the 1938 film Alf's Button Afloat and by Angela Lansbury in the 1945 film The Picture of Dorian Gray and again by Lansbury in the 1985 episode "Sing a Song of Murder" from her TV series Murder, She Wrote.   With frequent collaborator Dan Lipton (1873–1935) Murphy also wrote both "She's a Lassie from Lancashire" (1907) and "My Girl's a Yorkshire Girl" (1908), the latter mentioned by James Joyce in his novel Ulysses and also turned into a 1909 short sound film of the same name. 

Murphy is perhaps best known for the song "Has Anybody Here Seen Kelly?" with lyric by Will Letters, published in 1909.  The song was written for Florrie Forde, and was a follow-up to another Murphy song written for Forde,  "Oh, Oh, Antonio", a success the previous year.  Forde regularly performed in the Isle of Man each summer, and "Has Anybody Here Seen Kelly?" made reference to "Kelly from the Isle of Man" as being "as bad as old Antonio".   The song was immediately successful, becoming "the rage all over England".   In discussing the song, Murphy said: "To find a refrain which will go with a swing is the secret of success in popular song-writing for the general public... It must have a melody in which 'something sticks out', so to speak."  The song reached the United States, where the lyrics were partly rewritten by William McKenna to set it in New York; it became a hit for Nora Bayes.  In 1926, "Has Anybody Here Seen Kelly?" was made into an animated short of the same title directed by Dave Fleischer, and in 1928 into a feature film directed by William Wyler.  The song was also performed in the 1943 film Hello Frisco, Hello.  Murphy and Letters wrote further songs for Forde including "Flanagan" (1910) with the refrain "Flanagan, Flanagan, take me to the Isle of Man again", alluding to Forde's real surname of Flanagan.

Murphy also wrote several songs for Billy Williams, including "Put Me Amongst the Girls" (with Dan Lipton, 1908), as well as continuing to write for Florrie Forde songs including "Hold Your Hand Out, Naughty Boy" (with Worton David, 1913).

Murphy died in the night of 18/19 June 1913 in Blackpool, Lancashire, England, at the age of 43.   His name is sometimes given as Clarence Wainwright Murphy, apparently in error. Peter Gammond wrote that "the life of Murphy is shrouded in silence, but the catchy songs he wrote have not perished".

Works

 Sole credit
 "Clara & Sarah" – 1897
 "Baby Loo (How Can I Be Poor)" – 1898
 "Hooligan's Canary" – 1898
 "How Can I Be Poor?" – 1898
 "How Can They Tell That Oi'm Oirish?" – 1898
 "Kelly, the Car-man" – 1898
 "Jane Magee" – 1898
 "Everybody Loves You" – 1900
 "Just the Same To-day" – 1900
 "Mulligan's Motor-car" – 1900
 "Just As Long As You Love Me" – 1901
 "Dat Little Gal of Johnson's" – 1902
 "I Did Feel Sorry" – 1902
 "I Don't Want To Be A Honeysuckle" – 1902
 "I Live in Trafalgar Square" – 1902
 "If That Comes True" – 1902
 "Mama's Little Sleepy-eyes!" – 1902
 "Molly O'Malley" – 1902
 "My Home is My Garden" – 1902
 "The Coloured Millionaire" – 1902
 "The Girl in the Panama" – 1902
 "Hanging Mother's Picture on a Nail" – 1903
 "The Giddy Little Isle of Man" – 1903
 "Good-night, Little Girl" – 1904
 "The Little Irish Postman" – 1904
 "You Wish You Were A Girl" – 1904
 "Welcome Home, Sailor Boy!" – 1905
 "Betty, I'm Pining" – 1906
 "Little Cloud with the Silv'ry Lining" – 1907
 "My Chateau in Barcelona" – 1907
 "The House, the Flat and the Bungalow" – 1907
 "Alphonso, My Alphonso" – 1909
 "Mum-mum-mum-Mary" – 1909
 "Boss of the House" – 1910
 "In Your Old Tam-O'-Shanter" – 1910
 "The Kelly" – 1910
 "O'Brien" – 1911
 "Hogmanay" – 1912
 "You Must Come Round on Saturday" – 1912
 "We Must Have a Song about the Isle of Man" – 1912
 with Andrew N. Allen
 "Let's All Go into the Ballroom" – 1912
 with Walt Alwyn
 "Kicking Up a Row Like That" – 1900
 with George Arthurs
 "Making Up the Quarrel" – 1904
 "Bashful!" – 1906
 "Costumes, Gowns & Frocks" – 1907
 "Fire! Fire! Fire!" – 1907
 "Firelight" – 1907
 "Get It Over!" – 1907
 "Put Me Amongst the Girls" – 1907
 "Don't Be Ridiculous, Nicholas!" – 1908
 "I Could Get Along So Nicely With You" – 1908
 "I'm Not Looking for a Beautiful Girl" – 1908
 "I've Been Fishing for Pearls" – 1908
 with Edgar Bateman
 "Mrs. Carter" – 1900
 "The Garden Filled With Gold" – 1904
 "Dear Little Shadow" – 1905
 "It's Our Silver Wedding" – 1907
 with Harry Castling
 "Let's All Go Down the Strand" – 1904
 "Good-Night, Number One!" – 1905
 "Hello, Little Girl! Who Are You?" – 1905
 "It's the Best World We've Ever Seen" – 1905
 "Little Glow-worm!" – 1905
 "Bangalore" – 1906
 "Barbados" – 1906
 "Farewell, New York!" – 1906
 "If Your Hair Were Not So Curly" – 1906
 "Rowing To Hampton Court" – 1907
 "I Would Still Love You" – 1908
 "Meet Me, Jenny, When the Sun Goes Down" – 1908
 "Pull Yourselves Together, Girls" – 1909
 "The Girl in the Clogs and Shawl" – 1909 (cited in E. M. Forster's novel, A Passage to India)
 "The Singer Was Irish" – 1910
 "Have a Banana!" – 1910
 "I'm the Man That Buried Flanagan" – 1911
 "We All Go the Same Way Home" – 1911
 with Charles Collins
 "Come and Hear Him Play His Oom-Tera-Ra" – 1909
 "On the Same Place Every Time" – 1910
 with Worton David
 "Have You Heard John James O'Hara?" – 1911
 "Follow The Footsteps in the Snow" – 1912
 "They're All Single by the Seaside" – 1911
 "Hold Your Hand Out You Naughty Boy" – 1914
 "Keep Your Head Down, Fritzi Boy (We Saw You)" – 1918
 with Charles Deane
 "All Have A Dinner With Me" – 1893
 with W. Farrell
 "Irish As She's Spoken" – 1893
 with Albert Hall
 "Still His Whiskers Grew" – ?
 "Maggie Marney" – 1894
 "Oh Where is My Wandering Boy To-Night?" – 1894
 "A Glorious Sprig of Shamrock for Your Coat" – 1900
 "The Baby's Name" – 1900
 "My Blind Norah" – 1901
 with W. Hargreaves
 "Little Yellow-bird" – 1903
 with Fred W. Leigh
 "Dominic McCue" – 1906
 "Goo-Goo Land" – 1908
 with Will Letters
 "Has Anybody Here Seen Kelly?" – 1908
 "The Kelly Two-Step" – 1909
 "Flanagan" – 1910
 "Hi, Hi, Hi, Mr. McKie" – 1911
 with Dan Lipton
 "Don't Tell the World Your Troubles" – ?
 "If I Had A Girl As Nice As You" – ?
 "Run, Run, You Little Ones (Sweep! Sweep! Sweep!)" - 1904
 "The Ugly Duckling" – 1904
 "Go Away Mr. Crocodile" – 1904
 "Bombombay" – 1905
 "Ain't Yer Gwin Ter Say 'How Do?'" – 1906
 "As I Stand by the Old Church Door" – 1906
 "It is the Scarecrow" – 1906
 "Put Me Amongst The Girls" – 1907
 "My Girl's A Yorkshire Girl" – 1908
 "Oh, Oh Antonio" – 1908
 "Take Me Back to the Isle of Man!" – 1908
 "I Only Got Married To-Day" – 1909
 "I'll Be Cross, Arabella" – 1909
 "Plink Plonk, Or: The Skin of a Spanish Onion" – 1909
 "We Don't Want More Daylight" – 1909
 "I Shall Sulk" – 1910
 "Shirts" – 1910
 "The First Time That I've Been in Love" – 1910
 "We'll Treat You like One of Our Own" – 1910
 "No Wonder I Look Jolly" – 1911
 "You Must All Do as I Do" – 1912
 "Beautiful, Beautiful Bed" – 1915
 "Bed, Wonderful Bed" – 1915
 with Dan Lipton and Magini
 "I Wonder What It Feels Like To Be Poor" – 1920
 with Dan Lipton and John Neat
 "She's A Lassie from Lancashire" – 1907
 with Dan Lipton and Hugh Owen
 "I've a Garden in Sweden" – 1907
 "If You Were The Only Girl on Earth" – 1908
 with Hugh Owen
 "Don't Throw Stones at Other People's Windows" – 1907
 with George A. Stephens
 "I'm the Best Pal I've Ever Had!" – 1908
 with R.P. Weston and F.J. Barnes
 "I Don't Like Your Stovepipe Hat" – 1907

References

External links
 AntiQBook
 
 Melody Lane
 Amazon.com.uk
 The Sheet Music Warehouse
 The Mudcat Cafe
 Walking Oliver
  (animated version)
  (live action film)
 
 My Girl’s a Yorkshire Girl (lyrics)
 Beautiful, Beautiful Bed (Cover of American sheet music)
 Charles William Murphy
 Rowing To Hampton Court (links to mp3 and wav files of 1907 cylinder recording)

British musical theatre composers
British popular music
1870 births
1913 deaths